The Order of Karl Marx was the most important order  in the German Democratic Republic (GDR).  The award of the order also included a prize of 20,000 East German marks.

The order was founded on May 5, 1953 on the occasion of Karl Marx's 135th birthday during Karl Marx Year and on the recommendation of the GDR Council of Ministers. It was granted to individuals, enterprises, organizations, and military groups for exceptional merit in relation to ideology, culture, economy, and other designations. Additionally, citizens of other countries could also be awarded the order.

Notable recipients of the Order

1953: Hermann Duncker, Otto Grotewohl, Luise Kähler, Hermann Matern, Wilhelm Pieck, Wilhelm Zaisser
1956: Wilhelm Koenen
1961: Alfred Kurella, Gherman Titov
1962: Alexander Abusch, Karl Bittel, Franz Dahlem, Herbert Warnke, Otto Winzer
1963: Yuri Gagarin, Karl Maron, Willy Rumpf, Valentina Tereshkova
1965: Pavel Belyayev, Paul Fröhlich, Aleksei Leonov, Hans Schaul
1966: Helene Berg
1967: Rudolf Dölling, John Heartfield, Wilhelm Kling, Karl Mewis 
1968: Max Burghardt, Roman Chwalek, Kurt Seibt
1969: Walter Beling, Paul Dessau, Erich Honecker, Jürgen Kuczynski, Hermann Matern, Albert Norden, Willi Stoph, Lotte Ulbricht, Paul Verner
1970: Bruno Apitz, Otto Braun, Max Burghardt, Ernst Busch, Fritz Dallmann, Heinz Hoffmann, Erwin Kramer, Erich Mückenberger, Harry Tisch
1971: Erich Correns
1972: Fritz Cremer, Max Fechner, Klaus Gysi, Kurt Hager, Erich Honecker, Max Spangenberg
1973: Ernst Albert Altenkirch, Eva Altmann, Werner Bruschke, Friedrich Dickel, Ernst Goldenbaum, Erich Mielke, Fred Oelßner
1974: Walter Arnold, Walter Bartel, Bruno Beater, Jurij Brězan, Leonid Brezhnev, Walter Buchheim, Fritz Cremer, Käthe Dahlem, Arthur Franke, Alexander Schalck-Golodkowski, Willi Stoph, Josip Broz Tito, Markus Wolf, Todor Zhivkov
1975: Edmund Collein, Werner Eggerath, Horst Sindermann, Aleksandr Vasilevsky, Paul Wandel
1976: Vladimir Aksyonov, Hermann Axen, Valery Bykovsky, Luis Corvalán, Luise Ermisch, Manfred Ewald, Wolfgang Junker, Günter Mittag, Ernst Scholz, Paul Verner, Werner Walde
1977: Friedel Apelt, Hilde Benjamin, Klaus Gysi, Kurt Hager, Erich Honecker, Margot Honecker, Erich Mielke, Josip Broz Tito
1978: Valery Bykovsky, Fritz Eikemeier, Werner Felfe, Hans Modrow, Joachim Herrmann, Werner Krolikowski, Konrad Naumann, Elli Schmidt, Sigmund Jähn
1979: Leonid Brezhnev, Johannes Chemnitzer, Horst Dohlus, Peter Edel, Ernst Engelberg, Klaus Fuchs, Gerhard Grüneberg, Heinz Keßler
1980: Heinz Hoffmann, Alfred Lemmnitz, Siegfried Lorenz
1981: Leonid Brezhnev, Peter Florin, Erwin Geschonneck, Albert Norden, Gerhard Schürer
1982: Hilde Eisler, Kurt Hager, Erich Honecker, Kim Il-sung, Erich Mielke, Alexander Schalck-Golodkowski, Paul Scholz
1983: Theo Balden, Gerhard Beil, Friedrich Dickel, Wilhelm Ehm, Oskar Fischer, Egon Krenz, Werner Scheler, Lotte Ulbricht, Gustáv Husák
1984: 6th Flotilla of the East German People's Navy, Alfred Neumann, Willi Stoph, 
1985: Friedrich Dickel, Horst Dohlus, Heinz Hoffmann, Erich Honecker, Bruno Lietz, Erich Mückenberger, Ilse Thiele
1986: Heinrich Adameck, Fidel Castro, Luise Dornemann, Gisela Glende, Günter Mittag
1987: Hilde Benjamin, Margot Honecker, Werner Jarowinsky, Erich Mielke, Markus Wolf
1988: Georgi Atanasov, Nicolae Ceauşescu, Manfred Gerlach, Joachim Herrmann, Kurt Seibt
1989: Horst Brünner, Angel Dimitrov, Alexi Ivanov, Günter Schabowski, Willi Stoph, Petur Tanchev, Herbert Weiz, Günther Wyschofsky

See also
Awards and decorations of East Germany
Order of Lenin
Order of Georgi Dimitrov
Order of Kim Il-Sung

References

Orders, decorations, and medals of East Germany
Awards established in 1953
Awards disestablished in 1989
1953 establishments in East Germany
1989 disestablishments in East Germany
Karl Marx